The following is a list of events relating to television in the Republic of Ireland from 1976.

Events
18 October – Minister for Posts and Telegraphs Conor Cruise O'Brien issues a directive to RTÉ, providing clarification on the organisations whose members are banned from broadcast. The move follows the issuing of the original directive regarding this issue in 1971.
21 December – The Broadcasting Authority (Amendment) Act becomes law. The Act includes amendments to Section 31 of the original 1960 Broadcasting Authority Act and the establishment of the Broadcasting Complaints Commission.

Debuts
23 October –  The Great Grape Ape Show (1975)
27 October –  The Wombles (1973–1975)

Ongoing television programmes
RTÉ News: Nine O'Clock (1961–present)
RTÉ News: Six One (1962–present)
The Late Late Show (1962–present)
The Riordans (1965–1979)
Quicksilver (1965–1981)
Wanderly Wagon (1967–1982)
Hall's Pictorial Weekly (1971–1980)
Sports Stadium (1973–1997)
Trom agus Éadrom (1975–1985)
The Late Late Toy Show (1975–present)

Ending this year
Unknown – Seven Days (1966–1976)

Births
11 August – Claire Byrne, journalist and television presenter
16 September – Liz Bonnin, television presenter
Undated – Dáithí Ó Sé, television presenter

See also
1976 in Ireland

References

 
1970s in Irish television